Round trip may refer to:

Science and technology
Round-trip delay time, in communications
Round-trip engineering, automatic synchronization of related software development artifacts
Round-trip format conversion, in document conversion
Round-trip gain, in laser physics
Round-trip translation of text, using machine translation

Media

Films
Roundtrip (film), a 2004 comedy film

Music
Round Trip (Phil Woods album), a 1969 album by Phil Woods
Round Trip (Sadao Watanabe album), a 1974 album by Sadao Watanabe
Round Trip (The Knack album), a 1981 album by The Knack
Round Trip (Ralph Moore album), a 1987 album by jazz saxophonist Ralph Moore
Round Trip (The Gap Band album), a 1989 album by The Gap Band
Roundtrip, a 2007 album by Kirk Whalum
Round Trip (Tony Harnell album), a 2010 album by Tony Harnell

Other uses
Round-tripping (finance), a type of financial transaction